V85 refers to a principle on vehicle traffic law where the legal speed limit of a motorway is decreased 15%  due to hazardous weather conditions. This is a common practice amongst many countries within the European Union, most notably France.

References

Traffic law
Highways